Kepler-1544b is a potentially habitable (optimistic sample) exoplanet announced in 2016 and located 1138 light years away, in the constellation of Cygnus.


Characteristics

The planet orbits the K-type star Kepler-1544, which has a metallicity of 0.02 Fe/H.

Kepler-1544b is considered a super-Earth with a radius of 1.78 Earth radii and an estimated mass of 3.82 Earth masses.

Habitability 

With an orbital period of 168 days, the exoplanet is located at 0.54 AU from the star, which is close to the orbital distance at Earth's Equivalent Radiation (0.49 AU).

Despite the fact that NASA considers this planet gaseous, it could have a surface composition considering that its mass stays below 10 Earth masses.

References

Exoplanets discovered in 2016
Exoplanets discovered by the Kepler space telescope
Transiting exoplanets
Super-Earths in the habitable zone